Ghess is a village in Bargarh district of western Odisha in India. Its population in 2011 was 3,342. It is known for its culture and for its role in the Indian Rebellion of 1857.

Location
Ghess is situated 43 km from the district headquarters, Bargarh, and 18 km from Sohela.

History
The place played an important role in the First War of Independence when the Zamindar of Ghess, Madho Singh, fought against the British along with Veer Surendra Sai, the King of Sambalpur. All male members of the Zamindar family were hanged or jailed or shot by the British. Madho Singh had four sons: Hatey Singh (hanged), Kunjal Singh (hanged), Airi Singh (shot with Chabila Sai, brother of Surendra Sai) and Bairi Singh (died out of suffocation with smoke when British set fire to the cave in which he was resting).

References

External links

Villages in Bargarh district
Cities and towns in Bargarh district